Nicholas Loftus Tottenham (1745 – 11 March 1823) was an Anglo-Irish politician.

Tottenham represented Bannow in the Irish House of Commons between 1776 and 1790, before sitting for Clonmines from 1790 to 1797.

References

1745 births
1823 deaths
18th-century Anglo-Irish people
Irish MPs 1761–1768
Irish MPs 1769–1776
Irish MPs 1776–1783
Irish MPs 1783–1790
Irish MPs 1790–1797
Members of the Parliament of Ireland (pre-1801) for County Wexford constituencies